Heidi Hollinger (born 1968) is a political photographer, documentary presenter and politician.

Life and work
Hollinger was born in Montreal, Quebec and attended McGill University.

After opening a photo studio in Moscow, she photographed over 100 political conventions in Russia, and traveled extensively to photograph other world leaders, including Vladimir Putin, Mikhail Gorbachev, Jean Chrétien, Fidel Castro, and the Dalai Lama.

After living for ten years in Moscow she returned to Montreal. For four years starting January 2011, she was a presenter of documentary series Waterfront Cities of The World for Discovery Channel. Each of 39 episodes of this series described one of the port cities in different parts of the world.

Exhibitions
Faces of the Opposition, Moscow Photo Center (1994); Kazan, Tatarstan (1994); Omsk, Russia (1994); Bergamot Station Galleries, Los Angeles (1995);
Building Moscow, Moscow City Hall (1995)
Politicians from A to Z, The State Duma, Moscow (1996)
New Genre: The Russian Political Portrait, Manezh Gallery, Moscow (1996)
Contemporary Artists, Metropole, Moscow (1996)
Politicians, Almaty (1998); Saratov (1999)
Peculiarities of National Politicians, Manezh Central Exhibition Hall, Moscow (1999); The State Duma, Moscow (2000)
Russians, Tretyakov Gallery, Moscow (2000); Canadian Embassy, Moscow (2000); Mike Bossy, Montreal (2000).
100 years of Moscow (as part of group show), Montreal City Hall (2000)
10 years in Moscow, Canadian Parliament, Ottawa (2001); Russian Embassy, Ottawa (2001)
The Russians Emerge, Russian Consulate, New York (2002); Philadelphia (2003); Cirque du Soleil, Montreal (2003); The Arts Factory, Las Vegas (2004); Carlu, Toronto (2004).
The Himalayas, Biosphere, Montreal (2004)
Selected Histories, Groupe Cossette, Montreal (2004)
Distinct Society, HollingerCollins Gallery, Montreal (2006)
300 Reasons to Love Havana/300 raisons d'aimer La Havane, Montreal Museum of Fine Arts (foyer Boutique-Librairie M) (March–November 2018)

Books
Heidi Chez Les Soviets, Les Intouchables. Montreal, 1999.
Peculiarities of Russian Politicians. Moscow: Vagrius, 1999.
Les Russes, Les Éditions Stanké. Montreal, 2000.
Russians. Moscow: Vagrius, 2000.
The Russians Emerge. New York: Abbeville, 2002. .
Monsieur Poutine, Vous Permettez?. Montreal: Semaine, 2008.
300 Reasons to Love Havana. Montreal: Homme, 2018.
300 raisons d'aimer La Havane. Montreal: Homme, 2018.

Collections
Hollinger's work is held in the following public collections:
Moscow History Museum
Moscow House of Photography
Montreal Museum of Contemporary Art

Politics
On May 14, 2021, it was announced that Hollinger would join Ensemble Montréal as a city councilor candidate in the Saint-Henri-Est-Petite-Bourgogne-Pointe-Saint-Charles-Griffintown electoral district for the 2021 Montreal municipal election.

References

External links

"The Heidi Chronicles" McGill News, alumni quarterly, spring 2001

1968 births
Living people
Canadian photographers
Photography in Russia
Canadian people of Finnish descent
Artists from Montreal
McGill University alumni
Academic staff of Moscow State University
Canadian women photographers